Steven Pitt may refer to:
 Steven Pitt (footballer) (born 1973), Australian rules football player
 Steven Pitt (psychiatrist) (1959–2018), American forensic psychiatrist

See also
 Steve Pitt (born 1948), English footballer